Rudolf Edlinger (Austria, 20 February 1940 – 21 August 2021) was a Social Democratic Party of Austria politician who served as Austrian Finance Minister (1997–2000) under Chancellor Viktor Klima. He was the president of the football club SK Rapid Wien between 2001 and 2013.

References

External links
 Rudolf Edlinger biography - Austrian Parliament 

1940 births
2021 deaths
Politicians from Vienna
Finance Ministers of Austria
Government ministers of Austria
Social Democratic Party of Austria politicians
Vienna University of Economics and Business alumni